Borovikovo is a rural locality (a selo) in Pavlovsky Selsoviet, Pavlovsky District, Altai Krai, Russia. The population was 350 as of 2013. There are 6 streets.

Geography 
Borovikovo is located 13 km northwest of Pavlovsk (the district's administrative centre) by road. Sibirskiye Ogni is the nearest rural locality.

References 

Rural localities in Pavlovsky District, Altai Krai